The Deutsche Apotheker- und Ärztebank eG (ApoBank, German bank for pharmacists and physicians) is a cooperative bank headquartered in Düsseldorf.

Structure
The Deutsche Apotheker- und Ärztebank is affiliated to the National Association of German Cooperative Banks (BVR). It offers its services primarily to members of medical professions like physicians, dentists, psychotherapists and pharmacists, their relatives, professional associations of medical professions as well as company clients from the health care industry.

Organization
The Apobank has a five-person board of directors and a supervisory committee consisting of 23 members. The board of directors is supported by an advisory council. In 2016, the cooperative had 107,000 members, 406,000 customers  and 2,563 staff members at 84 locations.

History
In 1902 the Kredit-Verein Deutscher Apotheker (KREDA; credit union of German pharmacists) was founded in Danzig by 18 pharmacists. In 1938 it was renamed Deutsche Apothekerbank e.G.m.b.H. and in 1939 it merged with the Spar- und Kreditverein Deutscher Apotheker m.b.H. After the bank was closed in 1945, it was re-established in 1948 as Westdeutsche Apothekerbank e.G.m.b.H. in Düsseldorf. For years the bank has been the biggest German cooperative bank according to total assets.

Annual financial statements
The financial crisis in 2008 and 2009 led to a massive slump of the net income. After no dividend was distributed for the fiscal year 2009 the Apobank paid a dividend of 4% for the fiscal years 2010 to 2016.

Awards
The Deutsche Aptheker- und Ärztebank awards the Karl-Winter-Medal.

References

External links
 Website of Apobank

Companies based in Düsseldorf
Cooperative banks of Germany
Corporate finance
Medical and health organisations based in North Rhine-Westphalia
Banks established in 1902
Banks under direct supervision of the European Central Bank
1902 establishments in Germany